Foma is the second album by the American band the Nixons, released in 1995. Its title was inspired by the 1963 novel Cat's Cradle, by Kurt Vonnegut. "Foma" is defined in the album's liner notes as "harmless untruths intended to comfort simple souls; lies." Foma has sold more than 500,000 copies.

The Nixons supported the album by touring with Gravity Kills. "Sister" was a hit on alternative rock radio.

Production
Recorded in Hollywood, the album was produced by Mark Dodson and the band. Seven of the tracks are rerecorded songs from the band's debut; of the remaining six, only three were written specifically for Foma.

Critical reception

AllMusic staff writer Erik Crawford wrote "Foma opens with a scream and then delivers a hard rock romp that will delight fans of the heavy alternative genre". The St. Petersburg Times praised the "aggressively hard-rockin' yet intelligent borderline metal sound." The Dallas Morning News labeled Foma "old-fashioned big-statement rock with big-statement chords."

The Dallas Observer called the album "enervating musically and downright silly and infuriating lyrically ... Which means, in short, they ain't no damn good any way you slice it." The Santa Fe New Mexican concluded that "with the exception of 'Sister', none of the 13 cuts on Foma stand out either musically or lyrically; they are not particularly distinguishable from the general din that is modern rock radio." The Philadelphia Inquirer deemed the band "pleasantly derivative."

Track listing
All songs by The Nixons/Lyrics by Zac Maloy except where indicated.
 "Foma" – 3:13
 "Head" – 4:05
 "Sweet Beyond" – 3:32
 "Sister" – 4:28
 "Smile" – 4:07
 "JLM" (Jesus Loves Me) (William Batchelder Bradbury/ Anna Bartlett Warner) – 0:24
 "Fellowship" – 4:12
 "Wire" – 5:15
 "Trampoline" – 4:44
 "Drink the Fear" – 4:36
 "Blind" – 5:56
 "Passion" – 4:28
 "Happy Song" – 6:18

Personnel
Ricky Brooks – bass
Jesse Davis – guitar
Zac Maloy – guitar, vocals
John Humphrey – drums

Additional personnel
C.J. DeVillar – engineer
Mark Dodson – engineer, producer
Willie Dowling – string arrangements
Eric Fischer – mixing assistant
Kelle Musgrave – production coordination
Eddy Schreyer – mastering
Michele Sepe – angel's voice
Mike Stock – engineer
Glenn Tipton – guitar solo on "Drink the Fear"
Toby Wright – mixing

Charts
Album - Billboard (United States)

Singles - Billboard (United States)

References

1995 albums
The Nixons albums
MCA Records albums